The Groovy Rednecks are an alt-country band from Los Angeles, California, who refer to themselves as being a "country band for people who hate country" and a "Drinkin' Band".  The Rednecks consist of vocalist/lyricist Tex Troester, guitarist Bob Ricketts, bassist Steve Seifert, drummer Chris Baily and guitarist Gary Riley.

Since forming in 1991, the Rednecks have played over 900 shows. The band has been considered a top LA Country Band for decades, was named a Top-10 LA Country/Americana band in 2017, and has been featured on the cover and in an in-depth story in the LA Weekly. They record for the label "Chicken Fried Steaks" and have been extolled for their "...wild, hootin’ and hollerin’ country rock..." 
As of 2020, they've released five CDs.

Members
Tex Troester – Vocals (founder) 
Bob Ricketts – Guitar
Steve Seifert - Bass
Gary Riley – Guitar / mandolin
Chris Bailey - Drums

Discography 
1997: Buzzed
1999: Wishful Drinking
2003: Ass Grabbin’ Country
2006:  Loud Mouth Drunks
2013:    Tawdry Tales

References

American alternative country groups
Musical groups established in 1991
1991 establishments in California